"How Come" is a 2004 song by D12.

"How Come" may also refer to:
 "How Come" (Ronnie Lane song), a 1973 song by Ronnie Lane
 "How Come" (The Sports song), a 1981 song by The Sports
 "How Come", a 2008 song by Brown Eyed Girls from My Style
 "How Come", a 2006 song by James Morrison from Undiscovered
 "How Come", a 2004 song by Ray LaMontagne from Trouble